Otley is a 1968 British comedy thriller film, starring Tom Courtenay and Romy Schneider. It was adapted by Dick Clement and Ian La Frenais from a book by Martin Waddell, and released by Columbia Pictures.

Plot
Tom Courtenay plays Gerald Arthur "Gerry" Otley, a charming but feckless young drifter who scrapes a living from selling antiques in trendy 1960s London. Gerry's responsibility-free life suddenly takes a serious turn, when he finds himself caught up in a round of murder, espionage and quadruple crossing. He is mistaken for a spy; is kidnapped and detained several times; and becomes romantically involved with a foreign agent (Romy Schneider) working for British Intelligence.

Cast
 Tom Courtenay .... Gerald Arthur Otley - "Gerry"
 Romy Schneider .... Imogen
 Alan Badel .... Sir Alec Hadrian
 James Villiers .... Hendrickson
 Leonard Rossiter .... Johnson
 Freddie Jones .... Philip Proudfoot
 Fiona Lewis .... Lin
 James Bolam .... Albert
 James Cossins .... Geffcock
 James Maxwell .... Rollo
 Edward Hardwicke .... Lambert
 Ronald Lacey .... Curtis
 Phyllida Law .... Jean
 Geoffrey Bayldon .... Inspector Hewett
 Frank Middlemass .... Bruce (as Frank Middlemas)
 Barry Fantoni .... Larry

Production
The exterior action takes place in a number of recognisable London locations: the area around Portobello Road street market in Notting Hill; a houseboat colony near Cheyne Walk in Chelsea; Bowater House in Knightsbridge; the Playboy Club in Park Lane; and the old Unilever milk depot in Wood Lane. A wide range of period British vehicles is featured: Otley drives an E-Type Jaguar, a Ford Anglia and an early 1960s passenger coach, and his disastrous driving test, which turns into an epic car chase, involves a driving-school Vauxhall Viva and a Ford Zephyr.

The film, whose interiors were shot at Shepperton Studios, marked the directorial debut of Dick Clement. He and Ian La Frenais, famous at the time for writing The Likely Lads, wrote the script.

Don Partridge co-wrote and performed the title music, "Homeless Bones", which was also released as the B-side of his single "Colour My World" (1969).

Awards
The film in 1970 won the Writers' Guild of Great Britain Award as Best British Comedy Screenplay.

Reception
Vincent Canby of The New York Times wrote, "Like Otley, the movie is a bad risk. Everything in it is borrowed and badly used—actors (Tom Courtenay, Alan Badel), situations (the triumph of the fraudulent fool) and even settings, including a rather handsome Thames houseboat that reminded me wistfully of 'The Horse's Mouth.' 'Otley' is the kind of movie that allows you to think about other movies, in those great gaps of time between the setting up of a gag and the moment when it is ritualistically executed." Gene Siskel of the Chicago Tribune wrote that the film was so boring it "could put Sominex out of business" and admitted to walking out on it, reporting, "I took the CTA to see 'Otley' at the Coronet theater in Evanston. The film began at 6:15 p. m. I returned home on the 7 p. m. train." Variety wrote that "the film has an uneasy lack of a point of view and fails to focus viewer's attention on any particular character or plotline philosophy. The frantic, intentionally incoherent episodes are sometimes amusing, but too often suffer from unoriginality." Judith Crist described it as "a bright, breezy, light-handed but never lightheaded spies-and-counterspies story". Jack Ibberson of The Monthly Film Bulletin was also positive, calling it a "vastly entertaining comedy-thriller" with "uniformly excellent" performances.

References

External links
 

1969 films
British comedy thriller films
British spy comedy films
Columbia Pictures films
Films set in London
Films shot in London
1960s comedy thriller films
1960s spy comedy films
Films scored by Stanley Myers
Films with screenplays by Dick Clement
Films directed by Dick Clement
Films with screenplays by Ian La Frenais
1969 comedy films
1960s English-language films
1960s British films